Cem Tosun (born 30 June 1990) is a Turkish footballer who plays for Darıca Gençlerbirliği.

References

External links
 
 

1990 births
Living people
Austrian people of Turkish descent
Footballers from Vienna
Turkish footballers
Turkey under-21 international footballers
Association football defenders